Stanley Bootle, known as Stan Kelly-Bootle (15 September 1929 – 16 April 2014), was a British author, academic, singer-songwriter and computer scientist.

He took his stage name Stan Kelly (he was not known as Stan Kelly-Bootle in folk music circles) from the Irish folk song "Kelly, the boy from Killane". His best-known song is the "Liverpool Lullaby" or "The Mucky Kid" which was recorded in 1965 on the Three City Four LP and sung by Marian McKenzie. It was also sung by the Ian Campbell Folk Group on the Contemporary Campbells LP. It was later recorded by Judy Collins in 1966 for her album In My Life. Cilla Black recorded it three years later as the B-side to her pop hit "Conversations". Kelly-Bootle achieved the first postgraduate degree in computer science in 1954, from the University of Cambridge.

Early life
Stan Kelly-Bootle was born Stanley Bootle in Liverpool, Lancashire, on 15 September 1929 and grew up in the Wavertree area of the city. His parents were Arthur Bootle and Ada Gallagher.

Education
Kelly-Bootle was schooled at the Liverpool Institute. He spent 1948–1950 doing his national service in the British Army, achieving the rank of Sgt. Instructor in RADAR. He attended Downing College, Cambridge, graduating with a first class degree in Numerical Analysis and Automatic Computing in 1954, the first postgraduate degree in computer science.

Folk singing career
In 1950 [1954, not 1950, from personal experience of Peter Gardner, who was also one of the founder members of the St Lawrence Folk Song Society, and who contributed to http://stlawrence.jongarvey.co.uk/], Kelly-Bootle helped found the St. Lawrence Folk Song Society at Cambridge University. As a folk singer-songwriter, he performed under the name Stan Kelly. He wrote some of his own tunes and also wrote lyrics set to traditional tunes. In the course of his musical career, he made over 200 radio and television appearances, and released several recordings, as well as having his songs recorded by others.

Discography
Solo releases include:
I Chose Friden – Songs for Cybernetic Lovers. Computer humour songs recorded in 1963.
Liverpool Packet, Topic Records release TOP 27, 1958. Songs about Liverpool.
Songs for Swinging Landlords To, Topic Records release TOP 60. Rent protest and anti-landlord songs of both varieties.
Wrote and produced a sound and song depiction of Merseyside called Echoes of Merseyside (LPDE 101) for the Liverpool Echo newspaper.
O Liverpool We Love You, Transatlantic Records XTRA 1076, released 1976. This album was a tribute to Liverpool F.C., prepared with the team's cooperation. While creating the album, Kelly travelled with the team for both UK and European games for several years, and also for two seasons managed several players, including Kevin Keegan and Tommy Smith.

Other audio recordings include:
Kelly performed the part of "The Rambler" in the BBC's 1958 production The Ballad of John Axon. This broadcast won the Italia Prize, and excerpts were subsequently released on a highlights LP. This was the first BBC radio ballad.
Two tracks ("Liverpool Town" and "The Ould Mark II") on Revival in Britain, Vol 1, produced by Ewan MacColl, Folkways Records FW 8728, Library of Congress R62-1246.
One track ("The Young Sailor Cut Down in His Prime") on Topic Sampler No. 2, Topic Records, TPS 145, 1966
Performing on Stan Hugill's Shanties from the Seven Seas, HMV 1970

Computing career
He started his computing career programming the pioneering EDSAC computer, designed and built at Cambridge University. He worked for IBM in the United States and the UK from 1955 to 1970. From 1970 to 1973, he worked as Manager for University Systems for Sperry-UNIVAC. He also lectured at the University of Warwick.

Writing career
In 1973, Kelly-Bootle left Sperry-UNIVAC and became a freelance consultant, writer and programmer. He was known in the computer community for The Devil's DP Dictionary and its second edition, The Computer Contradictionary (1995), which he authored. These works are cynical lexicographies in the vein of Ambrose Bierce's The Devil's Dictionary. Kelly-Bootle authored or co-authored several serious textbooks and tutorials on subjects such as the Motorola 68000 family of CPUs, programming languages including various C compilers, and the Unix operating system. He authored the "Devil's Advocate" column in UNIX Review from 1984 to 2000, and had columns in Computer Language ("Bit by Bit", 1989–1994), OS/2 Magazine ("End Notes", 1994–97) and Software Development ("Seamless Quanta", October 1995 – May 1997). He contributed columns and articles to several other computer industry magazines, as well.
 
Kelly-Bootle's articles for magazines such as ACM Queue, AI/Expert, and UNIX Review contain examples of word-play, criticism of silly marketing and usage (he refers often to the computer "laxicon"), and commentary on the industry in general. He wrote an online monthly column posted on the Internet. While most of his writing was oriented towards the computer industry, he wrote a few books relating to his other interests, including 
 Liverpool Lullabies, The Stan Kelly Songbook, SING Publications, 1960. Second edition, 1976.
 Lern Yourself Scouse – How to Talk Proper in Liverpool, Scouse Press, 1961, written with Fritz Spiegl and Frank Shaw. Sixteen editions published through 1991.
 The Terrace Muse, An Anthology of Soccer Songs and Chants, serialized in the Daily Express in 1970.

Death
Stan Kelly-Bootle died on 16 April 2014, aged 84, in hospital in Oswestry, Shropshire.

References

External links
Stan Kelly-Bootle's homepage
Son of Devil's Advocate aka SODA, Kelly-Bootle's online monthly column (2000–04); accessed 18 April 2014.
Stan died. No flowers or tears "Bill Leece salutes Stan Kelly-Bootle, a founding father of modern computing and Liverpool folk legend" - an obituary and tribute from his home town newspaper; accessed 23 April 2014.

1929 births
2014 deaths
Alumni of Downing College, Cambridge
British computer scientists
English songwriters
British technology writers
English computer scientists
Musicians from Liverpool
Writers from Liverpool
People educated at Liverpool Institute High School for Boys
Place of death missing